Hilton is a former village, now a neighbourhood, located just north of Rosehill in Aberdeen.

References

Areas of Aberdeen